Brian William Cederwall (born 24 February 1952, Christchurch, New Zealand) represented Wellington in rugby union between 1972 and 1983 playing 103 first class matches. Cederwall also played 52 first-class cricket matches for Wellington. He is the older brother of Grant Cederwall. He played four All Black trials also making the New Zealand juniors in 1973 and 1974.

References

External links

1952 births
Living people
New Zealand rugby union players
New Zealand cricketers
Wellington cricketers
Rugby union players from Christchurch
Cricketers from Christchurch
Rugby union fullbacks